A Bit of Previous is the eleventh studio album by Scottish band Belle and Sebastian, released on 6 May 2022 through Matador Records. It was preceded by the singles "Unnecessary Drama", "If They're Shooting at You" and "Young and Stupid". A non-album single, also called "A Bit of Previous", was released in June 2022.

Background
Belle and Sebastian intended to record A Bit of Previous in Los Angeles until the COVID-19 pandemic forced them to stay in their home city of Glasgow, making the album their first to be recorded there since 1999. The album title is a phrase used by the father of bassist Bobby Kildea to "winkingly acknowledge past relationships", although NME interpreted the title to be a reference to the Buddhist concept of reincarnation in that "you may already have 'previous' with people you meet".

Critical reception
On review aggregator Metacritic, A Bit of Previous received a score of 78 out of 100 based on 16 critics' reviews, indicating "generally favorable" reception. Quinn Moreland, writing for Pitchfork, felt that the "lyrics share a tight thematic focus" characterised by Belle and Sebastian's "clear, aphoristic language", although musically, "A Bit of Previous touches on a little bit of everything". Gary Ryan of NME highlighted the "universally lovely melodies and earworm choruses" and concluded that "All of the well-worn Belle and Sebastian hallmarks are present, but what's truly impressive is how effortless it all sounds this time around." Steve Erickson characterised the album as an "endearingly self-aware nostalgia trip", summarising that it "strikes a balance between the band's familiar sound and proving they still have something to say".

Bella Fleming of The Line of Best Fit wrote that due to the circumstance of being recorded in Glasgow it at first appeared "set to be standout, yet ultimately misses the mark". Fleming judged that while "carrying the same overall feel of If You're Feeling Sinister and The Boy With the Arab Strap, it lacks the depth and storytelling brilliance that originally made this band so exciting". Reviewing the album for PopMatters, Hayden Merrick stated that from the first track, A Bit of Previous "refutes the assumption that this is a return-to-form album. [...] Even the album title [...] seems to admit that golden age Belle and Sebastian will have only a bit part in this new release." Merrick felt that the band still only have "some" of what they used to.

Track listing

Charts

References

2022 albums
Belle and Sebastian albums
Matador Records albums